CenterLink is an American LGBT organisation which was founded in 1994 as a member-based coalition to support the development of strong, sustainable, LGBTQ community centers. A fundamental goal of CenterLink’s work is to strengthen, support, and connect LGBTQ community centers, and to help build the capacity of these centers to address the social, cultural, health, and political advocacy needs of LGBTQ community members across the country. CenterLink plays a vital role in addressing the challenges centers face by helping them to improve their organizational and service delivery capacity, access public resources, and engage their regional communities in grassroots social justice movements.

CenterLink produces an annual Leadership Summit for executive directors and board leaders of LGBTQ community centers and provides technical assistance and support to over 500 individuals and centers every year.

Membership
Serving over 270 LGBTQ community centers across the country in 45 states, Puerto Rico and the District of Columbia, as well as centers in Canada,  China, and Australia, CenterLink assists newly forming community centers and helps strengthen existing LGBTQ centers, through networking opportunities for center leaders, peer-based technical assistance and training, and a variety of capacity building services. Our efforts are based on the belief that LGBT community centers are primary change agents in the national movement working toward the liberation and empowerment of LGBTQ people. Serving over 2 million people annually, they are the heart and soul of the LGBTQ movement and are vital to our current well-being and dreams for the future.  Whether they provide direct services, educate the public or organize for social change, community centers work more closely with their LGBTQ constituency and engage more community leaders and decision-makers than any other LGBTQ network in the country.

CenterLink's website currently provides a web-based directory (and map) of community centers both within and outside of the United States, including Australia, Canada, and Cameroon.

Current members of CenterLink include:

History
In July 1987 Eric Rofes and Richard Burns convened a gathering of lesbian and gay community center leaders at the Los Angeles Gay and Lesbian Community Center in conjunction with the National Gay and Lesbian Health Association annual conference, seeking to build peer support and an exchange of ideas.

In June 1994 the heads of the Dallas, Denver, Los Angeles, Minneapolis and New York Centers (respectively, John Thomas, Kat Morgan, Lorri L. Jean, Ann DeGroot and Richard Burns) launched the National Association of LGBT Community Centers as part of the celebrations marking the 25th Anniversary of the Stonewall Rebellion with the goal of strengthening the movement of LGBT community centers. At that time, more than thirty centers gathered for an all-day meeting at the Lesbian & Gay Community Services Center of New York during the Stonewall 25 commemorations.

The Association began organizing twice-yearly annual meetings, in conjunction with the Health Association conference and the National Gay and Lesbian Task Force's Creating Change Conference.  Regional meetings also were organized around the country.   Without paid staff, the Association relied for many years on the leadership and coordination efforts of an annually elected Executive Committee composed of seven leaders of member centers.

In January 2004, CenterLink hired its first executive director and opened a national office in Washington, DC.  CenterLink has greatly enhanced its visibility with LGBTQ community centers and laid the foundation to make ongoing support and technical assistance available.  We continue to intensify our efforts to build sustainable LGBT community centers to ensure that LGBT people have access to, and benefit from, identity affirming and life-saving services and programs.

In 2008 the Association changed its name to CenterLink.

References

External links
 CenterLink
 CenterLink on GuideStar

LGBT community centers in the United States